The Austrian Zoo Organization (Österreichische Zoo Organisation - OZO) is the union of the Austrian, scientifically lead zoos, which keep to the international guidelines of the EAZA (European Association of Zoos and Aquaria).

Member zoos of the OZO fulfill in particular the following criteria:

High quality in animal husbandry
Participation in kind preservation and nature protection projects
Partaking in research activities for the preservation of the diversity of species

OZO's goals include the implementation of the European Union zoo directive within Austria, which is designed to ensure the protection of animals in zoos and in the wild.

Member zoos 

Tiergarten Schönbrunn, Vienna
Haus des Meeres, Vienna
Alpine zoo Innsbruck
Salzburger zoo Hellbrunn
Animal and nature park lock harsh stone
Zoo Schmiding

See also
 List of zoo associations

References
at.Zoo-Infos.org - The Austrian Zoo Database, a non-profit project with information about some 50 zoos, wildlife parks, aquaria, bird parks etc. in Austria (in English).

External links

Zoos in Austria
Nature conservation in Austria
Zoo associations